Microbotryum silenes-dioicae is a species of fungus first isolated from Brittany, France. Its name refers to its host species, Silene dioica. The fungus is the cause of anther-smut disease, which results in fungal spores replacing the pollen in the anthers. The species that most resembles ‘’M. silenes-dioicae’’ morphologically is M. lychnidis-dioicae.

Description
This species shows sori arranged in anthers. Its spore mass is powdery and brown. The spores are mainly globose, subglobose or ellipsoidal, measuring 6.5–10.5 by 5.5–9.0 μm and being pale coloured. The spore wall is reticulate, presenting 6–8 meshes per spore diameter, the latter being irregularly polygonal.

References

Further reading
Abbate, J. L., and M. E. Hood. "Dynamic linkage relationships to the mating‐type locus in automictic fungi of the genus Microbotryum." Journal of Evolutionary Biology 23.8 (2010): 1800–1805.
Vercken, Elodie, et al. "Glacial refugia in pathogens: European genetic structure of anther smut pathogens on Silene latifolia and Silene dioica." PLoS Pathog 6 (2010): e1001229.
Gladieux, Pierre, et al. "Maintenance of fungal pathogen species that are specialized to different hosts: allopatric divergence and introgression through secondary contact." Molecular Biology and Evolution 28.1 (2011): 459–471.

External links

Mycobank

Fungal plant pathogens and diseases
Ustilaginomycotina
Fungi described in 2009